Fluorene , or 9H-fluorene is an organic compound with the formula (C6H4)2CH2. It forms white crystals that exhibit a characteristic, aromatic odor similar to that of naphthalene. It has a violet fluorescence, hence its name. For commercial purposes it is obtained from coal tar. It is insoluble in water and soluble in many organic solvents.  Although sometimes classified as a polycyclic aromatic hydrocarbon, the five-membered ring has no aromatic properties.  Fluorene is mildly acidic.

Synthesis, structure, and reactivity
Although fluorene is obtained from coal tar, it can also be prepared by dehydrogenation of diphenylmethane. Alternatively, it can be prepared by the reduction of fluorenone with zinc or hypophosphorous acid–iodine. The fluorene molecule is nearly planar, although each of the two benzene rings is coplanar with the central carbon 9.

Fluorene can be found after the incomplete combustion of plastics such as PS, PE and PVC.

Acidity
The C9-H sites of the fluorene ring are weakly acidic (pKa = 22.6 in DMSO.) Deprotonation gives the stable fluorenyl anion, nominally C13H9−, which is aromatic and has an intense orange colour. The anion is a nucleophile.  Electrophiles react with it by adding to the 9-position. The purification of fluorene exploits its acidity and the low solubility of its sodium derivative in hydrocarbon solvents.

Both protons can be removed from C9. For example, 9,9-fluorenyldipotassium can be obtained by treating fluorene with potassium metal in boiling dioxane.

Ligand properties
Fluorene and its derivatives can be deprotonated to give ligands akin to cyclopentadienide.

Uses
Fluorene is a precursor to other fluorene compounds; the parent species has few applications. Fluorene-9-carboxylic acid is a precursor to pharmaceuticals. Oxidation of fluorene gives fluorenone, which is nitrated to give commercially useful derivatives. 9-Fluorenylmethyl chloroformate (Fmoc chloride) is used to introduce the 9-fluorenylmethyl carbamate (Fmoc) protecting group on amines in peptide synthesis.

Polyfluorene polymers (where carbon 7 of one unit is linked to carbon 2 of the next one, displacing two hydrogens) are electrically conductive and electroluminescent, and have been much investigated as a luminophore in organic light-emitting diodes.

Fluorene dyes
Fluorene dyes are well developed. Most are prepared by condensation of the active methylene group with carbonyls. 2-Aminofluorene, 3,6-bis-(dimethylamino)fluorene, and 2,7-diiodofluorene are precursors to dyes.

See also
CataCXium F sulf
Fluorenol
Indecainide
PD-137889

References

External links
 Fluorene in the National Institute of Standards and Technology database.

Molecular electronics
 
Polycyclic aromatic hydrocarbons